Astroblepus prenadillus is a species of catfish of the family Astroblepidae. It can be found in Ecuador.

References

Bibliography
 Eschmeyer, William N., ed. 1998. Catalog of Fishes. Special Publication of the Center for Biodiversity Research and Information, num. 1, vol. 1–3. California Academy of Sciences. San Francisco, California, United States. 2905. .

Astroblepus
Fish described in 1840
Freshwater fish of Ecuador